In Greek mythology, Erato (Ancient Greek: Ἐρατώ "desired" or "lovely") was a dryad. She was the priestess and prophetess of the god Pan, verses were attributed to her at an ancient oracle of the god, located at Megalopolis near Acacesium. Erato was married to Arcas, the son of Zeus and Callisto, and bore him three sons, Azan, Apheidas, and Elatus.

Notes

References 

 Pausanias, Description of Greece with an English Translation by W.H.S. Jones, Litt.D., and H.A. Ormerod, M.A., in 4 Volumes. Cambridge, MA, Harvard University Press; London, William Heinemann Ltd. 1918. . Online version at the Perseus Digital Library
 Pausanias, Graeciae Descriptio. 3 vols. Leipzig, Teubner. 1903.  Greek text available at the Perseus Digital Library.

Dryads
Arcadian mythology